Bridgette Marie Gusterson  (born in Perth, Western Australia), also known as Bridgette Ireland, is an Australian water polo player, at the 1995 FINA World Cup, and from the gold medal team of the 2000 Summer Olympics. She was a captain of the team from 1997 to 2000. 
She is the sister of fellow Australian water polo player and Olympic teammate Danielle Woodhouse.

Recognition
2002 - Inducted into Australian Institute of Sport's "Best of the Best"
2010 - Inducted into the Water Polo Australia Hall of Fame
2020 - Inducted into Sport Australia Hall of Fame

See also
 Australia women's Olympic water polo team records and statistics
 List of Olympic champions in women's water polo
 List of Olympic medalists in water polo (women)
 List of World Aquatics Championships medalists in water polo
 List of members of the International Swimming Hall of Fame

References

External links
 

1973 births
Living people
Sportspeople from Perth, Western Australia
Sportswomen from Western Australia
Australian female water polo players
Olympic gold medalists for Australia in water polo
Water polo players at the 2000 Summer Olympics
Medalists at the 2000 Summer Olympics
Australian water polo coaches
Recipients of the Medal of the Order of Australia
Sport Australia Hall of Fame inductees
21st-century Australian women